Sheldon names were used to identify launch vehicles of the Soviet Union when their Soviet names were unknown. The system was published by Dr. Charles Sheldon of the United States Library of Congress in 1968. The system emphasizes the basic families of launch vehicles with special indicators for variants within a family.

A typical Sheldon name is the F-1-m, a forerunner to the Tsyklon launch vehicle, or the F-2. The "F" indicates the launch vehicle family, the "1" indicates the upper stage, and the "m" indicates that the upper stage is manoeuvrable.

Cold War
Soviet Union–United States relations